Scheden is a village in the district of Göttingen, Lower Saxony, Germany. The commune of Scheden consists of the three villages: Scheden, Meensen, and Dankelshausen. The river Schede runs through the village. In 2020 the population was 1,871.

Incorporations
The following communities were incorporated in the commune of Scheden:
 Dankelshausen
 Meensen

People born in Scheden
 Johann Joachim Quantz was a flutist, flute maker, and composer, amongst others in the service of Frederick the Great.
 Senator Justus Christoph Grünewald, *1764 in Niederscheden. In 1801 the first communal savings and loan association of Germany was established on his suggestion.

References

External links

Soccer, tennis, table tennis, volleyball ...

Göttingen (district)